Elwood T. Beatty was an American Democratic politician who served in the California State Assembly from 1854 to 1857 and in both chambers of the Idaho Territorial Legislature from 1868 to 1877, serving as the presiding officer of all three bodies, and as Sergeant-at-Arms of one of the chambers of the Idaho Territorial Legislature. In 1880, he was a probate judge for Lemhi County in Idaho.

References 

|-

|-

1815 births
1883 deaths
California Democrats
Speakers of the California State Assembly
Speakers of the Idaho House of Representatives